The canton of Troarn is an administrative division of the Calvados department, northwestern France. Its borders were modified at the French canton reorganisation which came into effect in March 2015. Its seat is in Troarn.

It consists of the following communes:

Argences
Banneville-la-Campagne
Bellengreville
Cagny
Canteloup
Cesny-aux-Vignes
Cléville
Cuverville
Démouville
Émiéville
Escoville
Frénouville
Janville
Moult-Chicheboville
Ouézy
Saint-Ouen-du-Mesnil-Oger
Saint-Pair
Saint-Pierre-du-Jonquet
Saint-Samson
Sannerville
Troarn
Touffréville
Valambray
Vimont

References

Cantons of Calvados (department)